Donald H. McComb (March 24, 1934 – June 3, 2018) was an American football player who played with the Boston Patriots. He played college football at Villanova University.

He died on June 3, 2018, in his home in Haddon Township, New Jersey.

References

1934 births
2018 deaths
American football defensive ends
Camden Catholic High School alumni
Villanova Wildcats football players
Boston Patriots players
Players of American football from New Jersey
Place of birth missing
People from Haddon Township, New Jersey